Clepsis paralaxa is a species of moth of the family Tortricidae. It is found in the Federal District of Mexico.

The wingspan is about 17 mm. The ground colour of the forewings is pale brownish cream, strigulated (finely streaked) with brownish ferruginous and with yellow-brown markings with rust coloured anterior edges. The hindwings are cream.

Etymology
The species name refers to the similarity to Clepsis laxa plus the Greek prefix para (meaning near, close).

References

Moths described in 2010
Clepsis